The Order is the name of two fictional superhero teams appearing in American comic books published by Marvel Comics. The first team was a brief offshoot of the team Defenders, and the second is part of an initiative to place a superhero team in each state of the United States.

Publication history

Defenders offshoot
The original incarnation of The Order starred in the six-issue limited series The Order (April-Sept. 2002) intending to conquer the world in order to protect it. The team consisted of the original Defenders: Doctor Strange, The Incredible Hulk, Namor the Sub-Mariner and Silver Surfer.

Initiative version
A second Marvel Comics superhero team called The Order debuted in The Order vol. 2, #1 (Sept. 2007), created by writer Matt Fraction and penciler Barry Kitson. Following the fallout of  Marvel Comics' Civil War crossover event, The Order was dubbed the First Super Hero Team of Tomorrow being the official superhero team for California as part of the Fifty States Initiative. The group was originally intended to be named The Champions, before it was revealed that the trademark was owned by Heroic Publishing, and were first seen during the end of the Civil War with many of its members going unnamed during their first appearances. However, most would be a part of the new series though the designs of the characters were slightly altered.

As the cast of The Order is composed almost entirely of new characters, Fraction looked to a popular TV drama for ideas on how to acquaint readers with his protagonists.

Fraction framed each issue around a flashback sequence depicting an interview with each character explaining their past and why they joined the Order to give each character a detailed introduction.

In late January 2008, Fraction revealed on Newsarama's podcast "Word Balloon" that The Order would end at issue 10. Though at first it was believed that Marvel had canceled the series, Fraction later stated on a later Newsarama interview that

Though the series was ended several of the book's characters and storylines would continue on in Matt Fraction's next project The Invincible Iron Man. The group also appeared in the 2008 Eternals series and Avengers: The Initiative #18.

Fictional team history

Defenders offshoot
The original incarnation of The Order starred  in the six-issue limited series The Order (April-Sept. 2002) intending to conquer the world in order to protect it. The team consisted of the original Defenders: Doctor Strange, The Incredible Hulk, Namor the Sub-Mariner and Silver Surfer.

Their fellow Defenders Hellcat, Nighthawk, Valkyrie and Clea team up with other heroes (including Ardina, a cosmic-powered woman they mystically create from a portion of the Silver Surfer's energy) to oppose the Order and return them to their senses, just in time to prevent the curse from rendering Yandroth omnipotent.

Initiative version

The team is largely made up of celebrities known for making a difference through charitable work, and through a process involving a viral genomech payload developed by Hank Pym each one is given superpowers modeled on the pantheon of Greek gods and trained at a S.H.I.E.L.D. base in Arizona. However, this process causes great strain on human bodies allowing the users limited time as superhuman (roughly a year).

The group, then known as the Champions, were first put to use in the final battle of the superhuman Civil War. Though unnamed, the group that went into the fight consisted of people that closely resembled Hercules, Pierce, Maul, an African-American Avona, Bannerman Brown & Green, Corona along with several others displaying a variety of different powers.

As the Californian Initiative team, slightly changed versions of many the first seen team face and defeat Infernal Man. After the battle, some members failed to follow the morals clause in their contract by going out drinking, and were subsequently fired and had their powers removed. Their replacements, Milo Fields, Mulholland Black, Magdalena Marie, and Becky Ryan were given different powers.

The team would come into conflict with various villains, most with a connection to General Softly and the mysterious "M.A.N. from S.H.A.D.O.W." military group, including hordes of Zobos (mechanized zombie hobos), Cold War supervillains, Gamma monsters, Namor, and an all girl gang called the Black Dahlias who have been given superpowers via the same process as The Order by M.A.N. from S.H.A.D.O.W. as well as deal with a murder case involving a former Order member.

The team is later evicted from its Bradbury, California headquarters and the M.A.N. from S.H.A.D.O.W. is revealed to be a collection of General Softly androids first devised by the Super Human Development and Operation (S.H.D.O.), an early attempt at a Fifty State Initiative from fifty years before; around the time of the real General Samuel Softly's death, and now part of a collection of villains (including Black Dahlias and Maul) led by Ezekiel Stane, the son of Iron Man enemy Obadiah Stane, who have set out to destroy The Order. After Stane reactivates Mulholland Black's powers to the point of them going out of control and depowering the rest of The Order, Henry Hellrung was forced to kill Mulholland.

The villains defeated, Tony Stark offers to repower the surviving members of The Order permanently and turn the team into a military operation rather than a public relations showcase. The Order will continue on as the Initiative superhero team of California. During the Secret Invasion, The Order was one of the two Initiative teams that the invading Skrulls were unable to place a sleeper agent on as the team was chosen by Tony Stark personally rather than Criti Noll, the Skrull impostor of Hank Pym. However, suspicions arose also between the members of the Order and almost culminated into a fight.

During the Fear Itself storyline, representatives of the Order are called by Prodigy when the Initiative is restarted and briefed on the hammers that the Serpent summoned to Earth.

Members

Defenders offshoot
 Doctor Strange
 Hulk
 Namor
 Silver Surfer

Initiative version

Current members
 Anthem - Henry Hellrung is the team's field leader and representation of Apollo with the powers of a living supercell thunderstorm; able to stimulate and separate positive and negative charges in the air to generate electricity. Hellrung was an actor who played Tony Stark on a TV series who eventually became good friends with the billionaire himself. During the peak of his fame, Hellrung and Stark were regular fixtures in the celebrity nightlife scene. However Hellrung's hard partying eventually turned him into an alcoholic and cost him his job and reputation within the industry. Hellrung joined Alcoholics Anonymous (AA), recovered, and eventually became well known for his activism within the organization. When Tony Stark himself also became an alcoholic, he joined AA and was sponsored by Hellrung. During the Dark Reign, Norman Osborn has Hellrung placed under arrest.
 Aralune - Rebecca "Becky" Ryan is a former two-time Little Ms. America, multiple time Teenager of the Year, and platinum selling pop star, Ryan now has the ability to shape-shift. Depicted as a pop-starlet akin to Britney Spears or Jessica Simpson, Ryan has faced various troubles in her successful career including bulimia and a sex tape scandal, which was successfully covered up by Kate Kildare. Ryan has been portrayed as a dedicated, hard-worker, but also as a people pleaser to her own detriment. Her powers are designed so she "can be whatever she wants" becoming a metamorph.
 Calamity - James Wa was an aspiring athlete known for his raw speed, but after a car accident that cost him both his legs he went into an engineering career. Already nicknamed Calamity, Wa designed Calamity-brand Cheetah prosthetic limbs. He is the representation of Hermes and has the power of super speed, reaching foot speeds of Mach 3. The character changed outfits between Civil War #7 and The Order vol. 2, #1.
 Supernaut - Sergeant Milo Fields is a former soldier who, along with his platoon, was held hostage for eleven days while serving in the Somali Civil War; four of his men were killed and the rest were abandoned and later found by some Military Police officers on leave. A greatly exaggerated version of the capture and rescue was turned into a Hollywood movie by the U. S. government. Fields, not liking how the government had portrayed his life story, became quite active in the Anti-war movement and was shot in the spine by someone who thought Fields was being unpatriotic, leaving him wheel-chair bound. His neural networks have been hardwired into Stark's satellite network. He now pilots an Omega-level mechanized battle-suit, Supernaut, using his neural networks and is considered the team's artillery. After mixing his blood together with that of the shape-shifter Aralune, Milo regained the ability to walk.
 Veda - Magdalena "Maggie" Marie Neuntauben was an actress known for her martial arts background and work with orphans; she has the power to summon humanoid golem soldiers out of organic materials that surround her using multisight to see through their eyes. However, she feels pain anytime one is destroyed.

Associates
 Tony Stark - The representation of Zeus, Director of S.H.I.E.L.D., and founder of the team.
 Kate Kildare of Hestia Public Relations - Kildare is the team's public relations agent and responsible for maintaining The Order's reputation in the public eye. Kildare used to date Hellrung during his days as an actor but split up with him when he became an alcoholic, though he eventually returned to her asking for her services to rebuild his career.

Former members
 Aphrodite - A former supermodel.
 Avona - representation of Athena Avery Allen is a gifted swordswoman, Allen was given a sword with integrated talking AI called "Bluetooth" with which Allen had a psychic link. She was fired and later murdered.
 Bannerman Brown & Bannerman Green - Two Stark Enterprises androids. They were later destroyed.
 Mulholland Black - Mulholland Black is the orphaned mutant daughter of two dead junkie grunge musicians. Black's mutant power enabled her to share a psychokinetic link with historical events allowing her to convert dormant energies lying just below the surface of Los Angeles into psychokinetic fuel for a variety of effects but after M-Day she lost this ability. While living on the streets, she joined the all-girl gang Black Dahlias but was later kicked out after cheating on one of its members. As part of The Order, Mulholland, who opted to not to use a code name, was given a power similar to her former ability, this power gave her a psychokinetic connection to L. A. itself through the people of the city. She also wields a power mallet, charged by her psychokinetic energy, which grants her flight. The Black Dahlias, who all gained superpowers, inject Black with Stark's S.P.I.N. Tech to remove her powers but somehow allowed her true mutant powers to resurface. Her out of control powers caused destruction on a massive scale and Henry Hellrung was forced to kill Mulholland to save the city.
 Corona - Representation of Helios. Carlos Araújo Carvalho was a living conduit of the Sun. He had an exo-suit providing an amount of control over its energy. Corona was later fired and then murdered.
 Heavy - Sergeant Major Dennis Michael Murray was a warrant officer who was injured during Tony Stark's V.I.P. visit to the front lines, leaving him paralyzed and in a tube in V.A. hospital. As part of The Order, he was submerged in a kind of super colloidal fluid contained within a suit becoming the team's trainer and tactician, and representation of Poseidon with the power of super strength measured on a seismic scale, rating Class 90, and the ability to fly. When his powers were removed by Ezekiel Stane, Murray died.
 Hercules - He had super strength and the ability to fly. His fate is unknown.
 Maul - The representation of Hephaestus. Jamal Peoples used an energy mallet, which provided flight and an energy covering his entire body as well as the ability to reduce any problem down to its component parts. He was later fired and then hired by Ezekiel Stane Peoples was captured and detained by S.H.I.E.L.D.
 Pierce - The representation of Artemis. Pamela "Pam" Peirce won an Archery Gold medal in Sydney. As part of the Order, she was given enhanced agility and used a bow with titanium tipped arrows. She also changed outfit and hair color between Civil War #7 and The Order vol. 2, #1. She was later fired.
 Pepper Potts - The representation of Hera. Pepper uses external technology to tap into Stark technology, including satellites, and acts as the team's logistical coordinator.

References

External links
 The Order (Initiative version) at Marvel Wiki
 The Order at Comic Vine

2007 comics debuts
Marvel Comics superhero teams
Marvel Comics titles
Comics by Matt Fraction